The 2024 CONCACAF W Gold Cup qualification competition, also known as the Road to CONCACAF W Gold Cup, is an upcoming women's football tournament that will be contested by 33 of the senior women's national teams of the member associations of CONCACAF. The competition will decide 6 of the 12 participating teams of the 2024 CONCACAF W Gold Cup, the inaugural edition of the W Gold Cup.

The league stage of the qualifying will be played between September and November 2023, with the three League A group winners qualifying for the final tournament. Three additional teams will qualify via the play-off round, contested on 17 February 2024 by the League A group runners-up and the League B group winners. These six teams will join the two CONCACAF teams qualified for the Olympics and four guests at the W Gold Cup, to be contested in February and March 2024.

Format
On 10 December 2020, the CONCACAF Council approved the structure and calendar of the competition. The qualification competition, known as the "Road to Concacaf W Gold Cup", will begin with the group stage, featuring 33 women's national teams of CONCACAF split into three leagues (A, B and C). Each league will feature three groups, containing three teams each in League A, and four teams each in Leagues B and C. The teams in each group will play against each other home-and-away in a double round-robin format. The top three teams in League A will qualify directly for the W Gold Cup. The three group runners-up of League A and the three League B group winners will participate in a play-off on 17 February 2024 to compete for the final three spots at the W Gold Cup. The play-offs were originally planned to take place in March 2024, but were moved to February to accommodate the W Gold Cup final tournament also being moved (from June to February and March 2024). The two CONCACAF women's national teams that qualify for the Summer Olympics in 2024 will receive a bye directly to the W Gold Cup, skipping qualification.

Teams and draw
In total, 33 of the 41 CONCACAF member associations will enter the qualification competition, not including the two CONCACAF teams that qualify for the Summer Olympics. The teams will be split into three leagues based on the CONCACAF Women's Ranking of March 2023 as follows:
League A: Top 9 ranked teams, divided into three groups of three teams
League B: Next 12 best-ranked teams, divided into three groups of four teams
League C: Lowest 12 ranked teams, divided into three groups of four teams

The draw for the group stage will take place on 17 May 2023.

Schedule
Below is the schedule of the 2024 CONCACAF W Gold Cup qualification competition.

League A

Group A1

Group A2

Group A3

League B

Group B1

Group B2

Group B3

League C

Group C1

Group C2

Group C3

Play-offs
The three group runners-up of League A and the three group winners of League B will advance to the play-offs (also known as the prelims). The six teams will be divided into three pairings based off the December 2023 CONCACAF Women's Ranking. The single-leg matches will take place in the United States on 17 February 2024, immediately prior to the 2024 CONCACAF W Gold Cup. The three winners will qualify for the group stage.

Summary

|}

Matches

Qualified teams
The following twelve teams qualified for the final tournament.

References

External links

2024 qualification
W Gold Cup
September 2023 sports events in North America
October 2023 sports events in North America
November 2023 sports events in North America
February 2024 sports events in North America